Belfer is a Polish television crime drama series starring Maciej Stuhr as a high school teacher investigating criminal cases. Broadcast in 2016, the first season was a rating success for Canal + as it broke their all-time record and won 2 awards, including Best TV Series at the Polish Film Awards. A second season premiered in October 2017.

Series 1 

The series was directed by Łukasz Palkowski and based on a script by Jakub Żulczyk and Monika Powalisz. It was shot in Chełmża, Kwidzyn, Chełmno and other locations.

 Cast
Maciej Stuhr: Paweł Zawadzki
Grzegorz Damięcki: Grzegorz Molenda
Magdalena Cielecka: Katarzyna Molenda
Robert Gonera : Bogdan Walewski
Paweł Królikowski: Sławomir Słota
Józef Pawłowski: Maciej Dąbrowa
Sebastian Fabijański: Adrian Kuś
Aleksandra Grabowska: Julia Molenda
Mateusz Więcławek: Jan Molenda
Piotr Głowacki: Rafał Papiński
Paulina Szostak: Ewelina Rozłucka
Krzysztof Pieczyński: Lesław Dobrzański
Łukasz Simlat: Daniel Poręba
Katarzyna Dąbrowska: Marta Mirska

 Plot

Freshly arrived from Warsaw in the fictional small town of Dobrowice, a high school Polish teacher investigates the recent murder of one of the school's students.

 Reception

The series was a rating success for Canal+ breaking its all-time best viewing figures, with an average audience rating of 345,000 and over 461,000 viewers watching the finale on 27 November 2016.

It was awarded the Special Prize at Telekamera 2017 and Best TV Series at the 2017 Polish Film Awards.

 Home media release

The first season was released on DVD on 17 March 2017.

Series 2 

Series 2, consisting of 8 episodes, premiered on 22 October 2017.

References

External links
Official website

2016 Polish television series debuts
Polish crime television series
Television shows set in Poland
Canal+ original programming